Porsuk is a village in the district of Çarşamba, Samsun Province, Turkey.

References
 

Villages in Çarşamba District